Fate of Worlds: Return From the Ringworld is a science fiction novel by American writers Larry Niven and Edward M. Lerner. It was first published in hardcover and ebook editions by Tor Books in August 2012, with paperback and trade paperback editions following from the same publisher in July 2013 and June 2014, respectively. It is the fifth and final book in the Fleet of Worlds series, itself a subset of Niven's Known Space series.

Summary
Fate of Worlds opens as Ringworld's Children (part of the Ringworld series) closes, decades after Betrayer of Worlds, the prior book in the Fleet of Worlds series. The novel thus concludes both series, and involves characters from both. After the disappearance of the Ringworld, the Fleet of Worlds' Puppeteers are targeted by rival war fleets, giving the exiled Puppeteer leader the Hindmost, who is familiar with Ringworld technology, the opportunity to regain his position.

Notes

2012 American novels
Known Space stories
Novels by Larry Niven
American science fiction novels
Tor Books books